The Nolly Awards, formerly the Nollywood Movies Awards, is an annual Nigerian film award presented by the Nollywood Movies TV to honour outstanding achievement in the Nigerian film industry. The inaugural edition was held at the Civic Center, Lagos on 2 June 2012. The most recent ceremony was held on 18 October 2014 at the newly commissioned Intercontinental Hotel,  which is the tallest hotel in West Africa.
In 2016, the awards was rebranded to The Nolly Awards, with the 2016 edition to hold on May 1, however, the ceremony didn't hold for the second year in a row.

Ceremonies 
2012 Nollywood Movies Awards
2013 Nollywood Movies Awards
2014 Nollywood Movies Awards

Categories 
As of 2013, the Nollywood Movie Awards has 27 categories.

 Best Movie
 Best Actress in a Leading Role
 Best Actor in a Leading Role
 Best Actress in a Supporting Role
 Best Actor in a Supporting Role
 Best Diaspora Movie
 Best Film in an Indigenous Nigerian Language
 Best Lead Actor in an Indigenous Language
 Best Lead Actress in an Indigenous Language
 Best Editing
 Best Sound Design
 Best Original Screenplay
 Best Cinematography
 Best Director
 Best Make-up Design
 Best Costume Design
 Best Set Design
 Best Music Soundtrack
 Best Rising Star (Male)
 Best Rising Star (Female)
 Best Child Actor
 Best Short Movie

Special Recognition Awards 
Goodluck Jonathan Lifetime Achievement
Popular Online Choice (male)
Popular Online Choice (female)
Top Box Office Movie (Nigeria)
Industry Patron Award
The Humanitarian Award

References 

2012 establishments in Nigeria
Annual events in Nigeria
Awards established in 2012
Entertainment events in Nigeria
Nigerian film awards